Michael Barrett Woodroofe (March 17, 1940 – February 22, 2022) was an American probabilist and statistician.  He was a professor of statistics and of mathematics at the University of Michigan, where he was the Leonard J. Savage Professor until his retirement.  He was noted for his work in sequential analysis and nonlinear renewal theory, in central limit theory, and in nonparametric inference with shape constraints.

Education and career
Woodroofe was born in Corvalis, Oregon, and grew up in nearby Athena, Oregon.  He received his Bachelor of Science in mathematics from Stanford University in 1962.  He went on to the University of Oregon for his masters and PhD in mathematics, which he completed in 1965.

After his PhD, he spent a brief stint as an assistant professor at Carnegie Mellon University, before moving to the University of Michigan in 1968.  He spent the rest of his career at Michigan, where he was a founding member of the statistics department.  In 1994 he was named the Leonard J. Savage Professor, a position which he held until his retirement in 2009.

Woodroofe was particularly noted for his work in sequential analysis and nonlinear renewal theory, in central limit theory, and in nonparametric inference with shape constraints.  

Woodroofe advised over 40 graduate students, many of whom have gone on to distinguished careers of their own.  He published over 100 research articles, and 2 books.  He served as editor of the Annals of Statistics from 1992 to 1994, and was the last solo editor of the journal.

Personal life
Woodroofe died on February 22, 2022, at the age of 81.

Awards and honors
 The Michael Woodroofe Lecture Series was established in 2008 by the University of Michigan Department of Statistics in recognition of Woodroofe's contributions.
 A Conference on Nonparametric Inference and Probability with Applications to Science was held in 2005 to honor Woodroofe's career on the occasion of his 65th birthday.
 Woodroofe was a fellow of the Institute of Mathematical Statistics.

Selected publications

References

External links
 

1940 births
2022 deaths
20th-century American mathematicians
21st-century American mathematicians
Academic journal editors
American statisticians
University of Oregon alumni
University of Michigan faculty
Fellows of the Institute of Mathematical Statistics
Carnegie Mellon University faculty
Stanford University alumni
People from Corvallis, Oregon
Probability theorists
Mathematicians from Oregon
Annals of Statistics editors